is a 1954 film directed by Motoyoshi Oda. It was distributed theatrically by Toho  on October 13, 1954.

Plot 
According to Multiple movie information sites ( Movie Walker, movie.com, KINENOTE listed in the section of external links ) have the same text story. According to it, it is almost true to the original, but there are the following changes.

 The bathtub where Keiko was killed is in the atelier in Nishi-Ogikubo and there is no transfer to the Juraku Hotel.
 Mitsuko was rescued by Kokichi and the authorities, and at this point it turns out that the ghost man and Tsumura are different people.
 Reproduction of the crime warning statement tape and the first harm to Mitsuko was the day after Keiko was killed, the photo session in Izu was several days later, and Mitsuko was killed several days later.
 There is no setting that only the first ghost man was Takebe.
 Finally, Kikuchi (Kikuchi, the original story) jumps and commits suicide by being caught up on the roof by Kanedaichi, who suddenly appeared with a pistol in his hand.

See also 

 Vampire Moth

References

Footnotes

Sources

External links

 

Films directed by Motoyoshi Oda
1954 films
Japanese black-and-white films
Toho films
Japanese mystery films
1950s mystery films
1950s Japanese films